In music a mixed-interval chord is a chord not characterized by one consistent interval. Chords characterized by one consistent interval, or primarily but with alterations, are equal-interval chords. Mixed interval chords "lend themselves particularly" to atonal music since they tend to be dissonant.

Equal-interval chords are often of indeterminate root and mixed-interval chords are also often best characterized by their interval content. "Equal-interval chords are often altered to make them 'impure' as in the case of quartal and quintal chords with tritones, chords based on seconds with varying intervals between the seconds."

References

Chords
Post-tonal music theory